PSR J2007+2722 is a 40.8-hertz isolated pulsar in the Vulpecula constellation, 5.3 kpc (17,000 ly) distant in the plane of the Galaxy, and is most likely a disrupted recycled pulsar (DRP).

J2007+2722 was found on data taken by the Arecibo radio telescope in February 2007, and analyzed by volunteers Chris and Helen Colvin (Ames, Iowa,
USA) and Daniel Gebhardt (Universität Mainz, Musikinformatik, Germany) via the distributed computing project Einstein@Home.

References 
Notes

Sources

External links

Pulsars
Vulpecula